Bakht-ur-Rehman Sharafat is an Afghan Taliban politician who is currently serving as the head of the railway administration since 14 March 2022. He has also served as Deputy Minister of Administration and Finance at the Ministry of Public Works

References

Living people
Taliban government ministers of Afghanistan
Year of birth missing (living people)